A yakhchāl ( "ice pit"; yakh meaning "ice" and chāl meaning "pit") is an ancient type of ice house that functions as an evaporative cooler. The structure had a domed shape above ground and a subterranean storage space. It was often used to store ice, but sometimes was used to store food as well. The subterranean space coupled with the thick heat-resistant construction material insulated the storage space year round. These structures were mainly built and used in Persia. Many that were built hundreds of years ago remain standing.

Design and process

By 400 BCE, Persian engineers were building yakhchāls in the desert to store ice.  A yakhchāl takes advantage of the low humidity in desert climates which promotes the evaporation of water (making evaporative cooling more effective) and promotes rapid cooling once the sun sets (water vapor inhibits radiative cooling in less arid climates).  In some desert climates (especially those at high altitudes), temperatures drop below freezing at night.  Water is often channeled from a qanat (Iranian aqueduct) to a yakhchāl, where it freezes when the temperature is low enough.

A wall is usually built in an east–west direction near the yakhchāl. Incoming water is channeled along the north side of the wall so that radiative cooling in the shadow of the wall cools the water before it enters the yakhchāl. Ice was brought in from ice pools or nearby mountains and stored in the yakhchāl.

At the same time, the tall conical shape of the building guides any remaining heat upward and outside through openings at the very top of the building, and through this active process the air inside the yakhchāl remains cooler than the outside. The yakhchāl is built of a unique water-resistant mortar called sarooj, composed of sand, clay, egg whites, lime, goat hair, and ash in specific proportions, that is resistant to heat transfer and is thought to be completely water-impenetrable. This material acts as an effective insulation all year round. The sarooj walls are at least two meters thick at the base.

Yakhchāls often have access to a qanat, and are sometimes equipped with bâdgirs (windcatchers or wind towers) built of mud or mud brick in square or round shapes with vents at the top which funnel cool air down through internal, vertically-placed wooden slats to the water or structure below. A bâdgir can also function as a chimney, releasing warm air out the top and pulling cool air in from a base opening or a connected qanat (air in a qanat is cooled by the underground stream). Many homes in desert towns are equipped with a bâdgir system.

The ice created and stored in yakhchāls is used throughout the year especially during hot summer days for various purposes, including preservation of food, to chill treats, or to make traditional Persian desserts like faloodeh and sorbets.

A yakhchāl in Kerman (over a mile above sea level) is located about one and a half kilometers from the center of the city. This cone-shaped building is about eighteen meters high. The massive insulation and the continuous cooling waters that spiral down its side keeps the ice frozen throughout the summer.

In present-day Iran, Afghanistan and Tajikistan, the term yakhchāl is also used to refer to modern refrigerators.

Ice pools

Many yakhchāls were built beside ice pools so ice could easily be transported to storage units within yakhchāls. Ice pools would use the cold of the desert nights to freeze water which would later be transported to storage as ice.

See also

References

Further reading

External links
 A TED talk  on radiative cooling.

Cooling technology
Architecture in Iran
Iranian inventions
Ancient history of Iran
Persian words and phrases
Ice trade